Istanbul Technical University's Science Center, located in Taskisla campus in the district of Taksim, Istanbul, is a center which encourages children to interact with exhibits. It opened in November 2007. The exhibition contains exhibits related to mechanics, electricity and magnetism, mathematics, dna, space and general physics.

References

External links 
 ITU Science Center, official page
 Gallery
 ITU
 ITU Science and Society

Istanbul Technical University
Science and technology museums in Turkey
Museums in Istanbul
Beyoğlu
Museums established in 2007
2007 establishments in Turkey
University museums in Turkey